Asani Warsha is a 2007 Sri Lankan Sinhala drama film directed by Vasantha Obeysekera and produced by Soma Edirisinghe for EAP Films. It stars Jagath Chamila, Kamal Addararachchi and Meena Kumari in lead roles along with Sanath Gunathilake and Mahendra Perera. Music composed by Premasiri Khemadasa.

Cast
 Jagath Chamila as Pradeep Godakumbura        
 Kamal Addararachchi as Sanjeewa Godakumbura
 Sanath Gunathilake as Minister Sirimanne  
 Meena Kumari as Ruwanthi 'Renuka' Gunasekara          
 Veena Jayakody as Grandmother       
 Mahendra Perera as Patrick       
 Semini Iddamalgoda as Kanthi   
 Janaki Wijerathne as Nayani      
 Nilu Hettihewa           
 Ranmini Lorensuhewa as Kanthi's daughter  
 Kasun Chamara as Alex
 Sampath Jayaweera

References

2005 films
2000s Sinhala-language films
Films set in Sri Lanka (1948–present)
2005 drama films
Sri Lankan drama films